The 1962 Cork Intermediate Hurling Championship was the 53rd staging of the Cork Intermediate Hurling Championship since its establishment by the Cork County Board in 1909.

Midleton won the championship following a 3–08 to 2–03 defeat of Cobh in the final. This was their second championship title overall and their first title since 1948.

References

Cork Intermediate Hurling Championship
Cork Intermediate Hurling Championship